The 2019 San Miguel Beermen season was the 44th season of the franchise in the Philippine Basketball Association (PBA).

Draft picks

Roster

Philippine Cup

Eliminations

Standings

Game log

|-bgcolor=ffcccc
| 1
| January 18
| Columbian
| L 118–124
| Arwind Santos (34)
| June Mar Fajardo (13)
| Alex Cabagnot (12)
| Cuneta Astrodome
| 0–1
|-bgcolor=ccffcc
| 2
| January 20
| Barangay Ginebra
| W 99–91
| Christian Standhardinger (26)
| June Mar Fajardo (11)
| Chris Ross (8)
| Smart Araneta Coliseum
| 1–1
|-bgcolor=ccffcc
| 3
| January 25
| Meralco
| W 105–93
| Marcio Lassiter (25)
| June Mar Fajardo (11)
| Chris Ross (8)
| Ynares Center
| 2–1
|-bgcolor=ffcccc
| 4
| January 27
| TNT
| L 93–104
| Christian Standhardinger (24)
| Christian Standhardinger (10)
| Chris Ross (15)
| Smart Araneta Coliseum
| 2–2

|-bgcolor=ffcccc
| 5
| February 1
| Rain or Shine
| L 98–108
| Marcio Lassiter (27)
| June Mar Fajardo (14)
| Chris Ross (11)
| Ynares Center
| 2–3
|-bgcolor=ccffcc
| 6
| February 6
| Blackwater
| W 93–79
| June Mar Fajardo (20)
| June Mar Fajardo (21)
| Chris Ross (6)
| Mall of Asia Arena
| 3–3
|-bgcolor=ccffcc
| 7
| February 10
| Magnolia
| W 113–92
| Arwind Santos (29)
| June Mar Fajardo (8)
| Cabagnot, Lassiter (4)
| Smart Araneta Coliseum
| 4–3

|-bgcolor=ccffcc
| 8
| March 8
| NLEX
| W 121–111
| June Mar Fajardo (27)
| June Mar Fajardo (13)
| Chris Ross (7)
| Smart Araneta Coliseum
| 5–3
|-bgcolor=ccffcc
| 9
| March 10
| NorthPort
| W 113–107
| June Mar Fajardo (40)
| June Mar Fajardo (19)
| Chris Ross (7)
| Smart Araneta Coliseum
| 6–3
|-bgcolor=ffcccc
| 10
| March 16
| Phoenix
| L 93–96
| June Mar Fajardo (29)
| June Mar Fajardo (12)
| Chris Ross (4)
| Panabo Multi-Purpose Tourism, Cultural, and Sports Center
| 6–4
|-bgcolor=ccffcc
| 11
| March 24
| Alaska
| W 114–96
| Alex Cabagnot (31)
| June Mar Fajardo (10)
| Chris Ross (14)
| Smart Araneta Coliseum
| 7–4

Playoffs

Bracket

Game log

|-bgcolor=ccffcc
| 1
| April 6
| TNT
| W 80–78
| Fajardo, Lassiter, Romeo (15)
| Fajardo, Standhardinger (10)
| Chris Ross (6)
| Mall of Asia Arena
| 1–0
|-bgcolor=ffcccc
| 2
| April 8
| TNT
| L 88–93
| June Mar Fajardo (26)
| June Mar Fajardo (19)
| Chris Ross (6)
| Smart Araneta Coliseum
| 1–1
|-bgcolor=ccffcc
| 3
| April 10
| TNT
| W 96–86
| June Mar Fajardo (32)
| June Mar Fajardo (14)
| Marcio Lassiter (6)
| Smart Araneta Coliseum11,147
| 2–1

|-bgcolor=ccffcc
| 1
| April 13
| Phoenix
| W 100–88
| Alex Cabagnot (26)
| Christian Standhardinger (16)
| Alex Cabagnot (7)
| Mall of Asia Arena
| 1–0
|-bgcolor=ccffcc
| 2
| April 15
| Phoenix
| W 92–82
| Marcio Lassiter (24)
| June Mar Fajardo (18)
| June Mar Fajardo (4)
| Smart Araneta Coliseum
| 2–0
|-bgcolor=ffcccc
| 3
| April 21
| Phoenix
| L 90–92
| June Mar Fajardo (22)
| June Mar Fajardo (19)
| Alex Cabagnot (6)
| Smart Araneta Coliseum
| 2–1
|-bgcolor=ccffcc
| 4
| April 23
| Phoenix
| W 114–91
| Alex Cabagnot (18)
| Arwind Santos (8)
| Ganuelas-Rosser, Ross (7)
| Cuneta Astrodome
| 3–1
|-bgcolor=ccffcc
| 5
| April 25
| Phoenix
| W 105–94
| Chris Ross (24)
| June Mar Fajardo (16)
| Alex Cabagnot (7)
| Cuneta Astrodome
| 4–1

|-bgcolor=ffcccc
| 1
| May 1
| Magnolia
| L 94–99
| June Mar Fajardo (35)
| June Mar Fajardo (21)
| Ross, Santos (5)
| Smart Araneta Coliseum
| 0–1
|-bgcolor=ccffcc
| 2
| May 3
| Magnolia
| W 108–101
| Cabagnot, Fajardo (16)
| June Mar Fajardo (14)
| Alex Cabagnot (6)
| Smart Araneta Coliseum
| 1–1
|-bgcolor=ffcccc
| 3
| May 5
| Magnolia
| L 82–86
| Arwind Santos (19)
| June Mar Fajardo (14)
| Chris Ross (7)
| Smart Araneta Coliseum
| 1–2
|-bgcolor=ffcccc
| 3
| May 5
| Magnolia
| L 82–86
| Arwind Santos (19)
| June Mar Fajardo (14)
| Chris Ross (7)
| Smart Araneta Coliseum
| 1–2
|-bgcolor=ccffcc
| 4
| May 8
| Magnolia
| W 114–98
| June Mar Fajardo (31)
| Fajardo, Standhardinger (14)
| Arwind Santos (6)
| Smart Araneta Coliseum
| 2–2
|-bgcolor=ffcccc
| 5
| May 10
| Magnolia
| L 86–88
| June Mar Fajardo (21)
| June Mar Fajardo (22)
| Fajardo, Ross (4)
| Smart Araneta Coliseum
| 2–3
|-bgcolor=ccffcc
| 6
| May 12
| Magnolia
| W 98–86
| June Mar Fajardo (23)
| June Mar Fajardo (18)
| Romeo, Ross (6)
| Smart Araneta Coliseum
| 3–3
|-bgcolor=ccffcc
| 7
| May 15
| Magnolia
| W 72–71
| Alex Cabagnot (18)
| June Mar Fajardo (31)
| Cabagnot, Lassiter, Romeo (3)
| Smart Araneta Coliseum
| 4–3

Commissioner's Cup

Eliminations

Standings

Game log

|-bgcolor=ffcccc
| 1
| June 5
| NorthPort
| L 88–121
| Charles Rhodes (27)
| Charles Rhodes (12)
| Alex Cabagnot (6)
| Smart Araneta Coliseum
| 0–1
|-bgcolor=ffcccc
| 2
| June 8
| TNT
| L 97–110
| Von Pessumal (24)
| June Mar Fajardo (13)
| Chris Ross (8)
| Ynares Center
| 0–2
|-bgcolor=ccffcc
| 3
| June 14
| Blackwater
| W 127–106
| Charles Rhodes (32)
| Charles Rhodes (19)
| Cabagnot, Ross (6)
| Mall of Asia Arena
| 1–2
|-bgcolor=ffcccc
| 4
| June 16
| Barangay Ginebra
| L 107–110 (OT)
| Charles Rhodes (34)
| June Mar Fajardo (19)
| Chris Ross (11)
| Smart Araneta Coliseum
| 1–3
|-bgcolor=ccffcc
| 5
| June 21
| Alaska
| W 119–107
| Alex Cabagnot (31)
| Charles Rhodes (11)
| Marcio Lassiter (7)
| Cuneta Astrodome
| 2–3
|-bgcolor=ffcccc
| 6
| June 26
| Magnolia
| L 82–118
| Charles Rhodes (20)
| Charles Rhodes (15)
| Cabagnot, Lassiter (4)
| Smart Araneta Coliseum
| 2–4
|-bgcolor=ffcccc
| 7
| June 30
| Columbian
| L 132–134 (OT)
| Charles Rhodes (26)
| Charles Rhodes (16)
| Chris Ross (6)
| Smart Araneta Coliseum
| 2–5

|-bgcolor=ccffcc
| 8
| July 5
| NLEX
| W 109–105
| Chris McCullough (47)
| Chris McCullough (10)
| Marcio Lassiter (6)
| Mall of Asia Arena
| 3–5
|-bgcolor=ccffcc
| 9
| July 10
| Phoenix
| W 128–108
| Chris McCullough (37)
| June Mar Fajardo (14)
| Chris Ross (7)
| Smart Araneta Coliseum
| 4–5
|-bgcolor=ccffcc
| 10
| July 13
| Rain or Shine
| W 89–87
| Chris McCullough (24)
| Chris McCullough (17)
| Chris McCullough (4)
| Xavier University Gym
| 5–5
|-bgcolor=ffcccc
| 11
| July 17
| Meralco
| L 91–95
| Fajardo, McCullough (27)
| Chris McCullough (16)
| Chris Ross (7)
| Smart Araneta Coliseum
| 5–6

Playoffs

Bracket

Game log

|-bgcolor=ccffcc
| 1
| July 21
| NorthPort
| W 98–84
| Chris McCullough (24)
| June Mar Fajardo (19)
| Lassiter, McCullough (4)
| Smart Araneta Coliseum
| 1–0
|-bgcolor=ccffcc
| 2
| July 24
| NorthPort
| W 90–88
| Chris McCullough (31)
| Chris McCullough (11)
| Chris Ross (7)
| Smart Araneta Coliseum
| 2–0

|-bgcolor=ccffcc
| 1
| July 27
| Rain or Shine
| W 111–105
| Chris McCullough (32)
| Chris McCullough (14)
| Alex Cabagnot (7)
| Smart Araneta Coliseum
| 1–0
|-bgcolor=ccffcc
| 2
| July 29
| Rain or Shine
| W 117–105
| Chris Ross (34)
| June Mar Fajardo (15)
| Chris Ross (8)
| Mall of Asia Arena
| 2–0
|-bgcolor=ffcccc
| 3
| July 31
| Rain or Shine
| L 104–112
| Chris McCullough (51)
| Chris McCullough (14)
| Chris Ross (7)
| Smart Araneta Coliseum
| 2–1
|-bgcolor=ccffcc
| 4
| August 2
| Rain or Shine
| W 98–95
| Chris McCullough (35)
| Chris McCullough (18)
| Chris Ross (8)
| Smart Araneta Coliseum
| 3–1

|-bgcolor=ffcccc
| 1
| August 4
| TNT
| L 96–109
| Chris McCullough (33)
| Chris McCullough (15)
| Chris Ross (7)
| Smart Araneta Coliseum
| 0–1
|-bgcolor=ccffcc
| 2
| August 7
| TNT
| W 127–125 (2OT)
| Chris McCullough (32)
| Chris McCullough (22)
| Cabagnot, McCullough (7)
| Smart Araneta Coliseum
| 1–1
|-bgcolor=ffcccc
| 3
| August 9
| TNT
| L 105–115
| Fajardo, McCullough (27)
| Fajardo, McCullough (13)
| Romeo, Ross (5)
| Smart Araneta Coliseum
| 1–2
|-bgcolor=ccffcc
| 4
| August 11
| TNT
| W 106–101
| Chris McCullough (27)
| Chris McCullough (22)
| Chris Ross (8)
| Smart Araneta Coliseum
| 2–2
|-bgcolor=ccffcc
| 5
| August 14
| TNT
| W 99–94
| Chris McCullough (35)
| Chris McCullough (22)
| Terrence Romeo (5)
| Smart Araneta Coliseum
| 3–2
|-bgcolor=ccffcc
| 6
| August 16
| TNT
| W 102–90
| Chris McCullough (35)
| Fajardo, McCullough (13)
| Romeo, Ross (7)
| Smart Araneta Coliseum
| 4–2

Governors' Cup

Eliminations

Standings

Bracket

Transactions

Trades

Preseason

Awards

References

San Miguel Beermen seasons
San Miguel Beermen